Bonnie Mary is a 1918 British silent romance film directed by A. V. Bramble and starring Miriam Ferris, Lionel Belcher, and Arthur M. Cullin.

Premise
Two feuding Scottish families are united when their children fall in love.

Cast
 Miriam Ferris - Mary Douglas
 Lionel Belcher - Rob McAllister
 Arthur M. Cullin - Andrew Douglas
 Jeff Barlow - James McAllister
 Elaine Madison - Jeannie Douglas

References

External links

1918 films
1910s romance films
Films set in Scotland
British silent feature films
Films directed by A. V. Bramble
British black-and-white films
British romance films
1910s English-language films
1910s British films